John Morgan (priest) was Dean of Waterford  from 1877 to 1903.

References

Alumni of Trinity College Dublin
Irish Anglicans
Deans of Waterford
Year of birth missing
Year of death missing